The 2013 Big Ten Conference baseball tournament was held at Target Field in Minneapolis, MN from May 22 through 25.  The six team, double-elimination tournament determined the league champion for the 2013 NCAA Division I baseball season.  Indiana won the tournament to claim the Big Ten Conference's automatic bid to the 2013 NCAA Division I baseball tournament.  The event was aired on the Big Ten Network.

Format and seeding
The 2013 tournament was a 6-team double-elimination tournament.  The top six teams based on conference regular season winning percentage earned invites to the tournament. The top two seeds received a single bye into the semifinals (2nd Round). The 1 seed played the lowest seeded Round 1 winner, while the 2 seed played the highest seeded Round 1 winner.

Tournament

All-Tournament Team
The following players were named to the All-Tournament Team.

Most Outstanding Player: Sam Travis, Indiana

References

Big Ten Baseball Tournament
Tournament
Big Ten Conference baseball tournament
College baseball tournaments in Minnesota
Baseball competitions in Minneapolis
Big Ten baseball tournament
2010s in Minneapolis